The year 2011 is the 15th year in the history of M-1 Global, a mixed martial arts promotion based in Russia. In 2011 M-1 Global held 20 events beginning with, M-1 Selection Ukraine 2010: The Finals.

Events list

M-1 Selection Ukraine 2010: The Finals

M-1 Selection Ukraine 2010: The Finals was an event held on February 12, 2011, at Acco International Exhibition Center in Kiev, Ukraine.

Results

M-1 Challenge 23: Guram vs. Grishin

M-1 Challenge 23: Guram vs. Grishin was an event held on March 5, 2011, at Crocus City Hall in Moscow, Russia.

Results

M-1 Challenge 24: Damkovsky vs. Figueroa

M-1 Challenge 24: Damkovsky vs. Figueroa was an event held on March 25, 2011, at Ted Constant Convocation Center in Norfolk, Virginia, United States.

Results

M-1 Selection 2011: European Tournament

M-1 Selection 2011: European Tournament was an event held on April 1, 2011, at Ali Aliyev Sports Complex in Makhachkala, Russia.

Results

M-1 Ukraine: International Club Grand Prix 1

M-1 Ukraine: International Club Grand Prix 1 was an event held on April 2, 2011, at Acco International Exhibition Center in Kyiv, Ukraine.

Results

M-1 Challenge 25: Zavurov vs. Enomoto

M-1 Challenge 25: Zavurov vs. Enomoto was an event held on April 28, 2011, at Ice Palace Saint Petersburg in Saint Petersburg, Leningrad Oblast, Russia.

Results

M-1 Selection 2011: Asia Round 1

M-1 Selection 2011: Asia Round 1 was an event held on April 30, 2011, at Seoul Fashion Center Event Hall in Seoul, South Korea.

Results

M-1 Global - Mix Fight M-1

M-1 Global - Mix Fight M-1 was an event held on May 21, 2011, at Orlyonok Sport Palace in Perm, Perm Krai, Russia.

Results

M-1 Global: M-1 Ukraine European Battle

M-1 Global: M-1 Ukraine European Battle was an event held on June 4, 2011, at National Circus of Ukraine in Kyiv, Ukraine.

Results

M-1 Challenge 26: Garner vs. Bennett 2

M-1 Challenge 26: Garner vs. Bennett 2 was an event held on July 8, 2011, at The Hangar at the O.C. Fair and Events Center in Costa Mesa, California, United States.

Results

M-1 Global: M-1 Fighter Tournament

M-1 Global: M-1 Fighter Tournament was an event held on August 6, 2011, at Saint Petersburg in Leningrad Oblast, Russia.

Results

M-1 Ukraine: King of Mixfight

M-1 Ukraine: King of Mixfight was an event held on September 15, 2011, at Crystal Hall in Kyiv, Ukraine.

Results

M-1 Belarus: Battle of Minsk

M-1 Belarus: Battle of Minsk was an event held on September 17, 2011, at Orion in Minsk, Belarus.

Results

M-1 Challenge 27: Magalhaes vs. Zayats

M-1 Challenge 27: Magalhaes vs. Zayats was an event held on October 14, 2011, at GCU Arena in Phoenix, Arizona, United States.

Results

M-1 Ukraine: Battle of Minsk

M-1 Ukraine: Battle of Minsk was an event held on October 15, 2011, at Minsk Sports Palace in Minsk, Belarus.

Results

M-1 Challenge 28: Emelianenko vs. Malikov

M-1 Challenge 28: Emelianenko vs. Malikov was an event held on November 12, 2011, at Star Centre in Astrakhan, Russia.

Results

M-1 Belarus 13: Belarus Fighting Championship

M-1 Belarus 13: Belarus Fighting Championship was an event held on November 12, 2011, at Orion Night Club in Minsk, Belarus.

Results

M-1 Challenge 29: Samoilov vs. Miranda

M-1 Challenge 29: Samoilov vs. Miranda was an event held on November 19, 2011, at Ufa Arena in Ufa, Bashkortostan, Russia.

Results

M-1 Global: Fedor vs. Monson

M-1 Global: Fedor vs. Monson was an event held on November 20, 2011, at Olympic Stadium in Moscow, Russia.

Results

M-1 Challenge 30: Zavurov vs. Enomoto

M-1 Challenge 30: Zavurov vs. Enomoto was an event held on December 9, 2011, at The Hangar in Costa Mesa, California, United States.

Results

M-1 Ukraine: Superfinal Grand Prix

M-1 Ukraine: Superfinal Grand Prix was an event held on December 17, 2011, at Acco International Exhibition Center in Kyiv, Ukraine.

Results

References

M-1 Global events
2011 in mixed martial arts